Rock tripe is the common name for various lichens of the genus Umbilicaria that grow on rocks. They are widely distributed, including on bare rock in Antarctica, and throughout northern parts of North America such as New England and the Rocky Mountains. They are edible when properly prepared; soaking extensively and boiling with changes of water removes the bitterness and purgative properties. They have been used as a famine food in extreme cases when other food sources were unavailable, as by early American northern explorers.

Umbilicaria esculenta is commonly used as a food in Asian cuisine and a restorative medicine in traditional Chinese medicine. It is called shi'er (石耳 "rock ear") in Chinese cuisine, iwatake  (岩茸 "rock mushroom") in Japanese cuisine, and seogi (석이(石耳)) or seogibeoseot (석이버섯) in Korean cuisine.

Species
Umbilicaria americana 
Umbilicaria antarctica 
Umbilicaria aprina 
Umbilicaria arctica 
Umbilicaria bigleri 
Umbilicaria crustulosa 
Umbilicaria cylindrica 
Umbilicaria daliensis 
Umbilicaria decussata 
Umbilicaria deusta 
Umbilicaria dura  – North America
Umbilicaria esculenta 
Umbilicaria hirsuta 
Umbilicaria hispanica 
Umbilicaria hyperborea 
Umbilicaria iberica 
Umbilicaria isidiosa 
Umbilicaria maculata 
Umbilicaria mammulata 
Umbilicaria meizospora  – Europe
Umbilicaria muhlenbergii 
Umbilicaria multistrata  – North America
Umbilicaria murihikuana 
Umbilicaria nodulospora 
Umbilicaria nylanderiana 
Umbilicaria orientalis  – East Asia
Umbilicaria phaea 
Umbilicaria polyphylla 
Umbilicaria polyrrhiza 
Umbilicaria proboscidea 
Umbilicaria propagulifera 
Umbilicaria pulvinaria 
Umbilicaria rhizinata 
Umbilicaria rigida 
Umbilicaria robusta 
Umbilicaria sinorientalis 
Umbilicaria spodochroa 
Umbilicaria subglabra 
Umbilicaria torrefacta 
Umbilicaria vellea 
Umbilicaria virginis 
Umbilicaria xizangensis

Gallery

References

 
Lichens